The 1906 International Lawn Tennis Challenge was the sixth edition of what is now known as the Davis Cup. As defending champions, the British Isles team played host to the competition. For the first time, the ties were not all played at the same location. The "World Group" ties were played at the Newport Athletic Club in Newport, Monmouthshire, England from 7–9 June, and the final was played at Worple Road (the former site of the All England Club) in Wimbledon, London, England on 15–18 June. Britain retained the Cup for their fourth championship.

Draw

1 Both semifinals were scratched and Australasia and the United States advanced to the final as Austria and France failed to appear.

Final
Australasia vs. United States

Challenge Round
British Isles vs. United States

References

External links
Davis Cup official website

Davis Cups by year
International Lawn Tennis Challenge
International Lawn Tennis Challenge
International Lawn Tennis Challenge
Events in Newport, Wales
Sport in Newport, Wales
1906 in English tennis
1906 in Welsh sport